Hesperevax is a small genus of flowering plants in the tribe Gnaphalieae of the family Asteraceae.

Hesperevax species are known generally as dwarf cudweeds. They are native to the west coast of North America, especially California. These are petite woolly annuals with discoid flower heads.

Species
Species include:
 Hesperevax acaulis - stemless dwarf-cudweed — California, Oregon
 Hesperevax caulescens - dwarf dwarf-cudweed, hogwallow starfish — endemic to California
 Hesperevax sparsiflora - erect dwarf-cudweed — California, Oregon

References

External links
 USDA Plants Profile for Hesperevax

Gnaphalieae
Asteraceae genera
Flora of California
Flora of Oregon
Taxa named by Asa Gray